Money worship is a type of money disorder. The core driver of this behaviour is the belief that having more money will lead to greater happiness in the afterlife. Individuals with this disorder are obsessed with the idea that obtaining more money is necessary to make progress in life and, at the same time, convinced that they will never have enough money to fulfil their needs or desires. Younger, single and low-net worth individuals are more likely to engage in this behaviour, which has also been linked to a higher probability of carrying over credit card debt from month to month. It has been suggested that young adults are most susceptible to money worship due to their higher impressionability from social forces such as social media and peer groups.

Money has been referred to as a "neglected" field in psychology however, the studies which have been conducted regarding the paradox of happiness and income, and money worship often failed to find proof that more money leads to more happiness, only finding a positive relationship when looking at short-term effects. Steven and Wolfer (2008) claimed that "cross-section data suggests that the answer to the question whether higher income leads to greater happiness is 'yes'; on the other, the time-series data say 'no'."

The time-series data often comes to the same conclusion as the Easterlin Paradox, which illustrates how at a set point in time more income can make people happier however, this isn't constant, with happiness decreasing as time passes. Findings which support the Easterlin Paradox indicate that long-term happiness is not correlated with money increase but does come from other, personal factors such as shelter, friendship, family, and food however, it is important to note that happiness is subjective to each person therefore the reason behind it is not universal. This aligns with the need theory that originates from Maslow's Hierarchy of needs. Need theory in the context of money promotes the view that money only brings happiness until all our basic needs are satisfied, after that it no longer increases our happiness. A study conducted by Princeton University researchers in 2010 revealed that happiness increased based on income up to around $75,000 dollars in a sample taken in the USA, after this it tops out and no longer affects our happiness levels. Data derived from the Bureau of Labour Statistics found that the median necessary wage needed to live across the USA is $67,609 annually which aligns with the results of the Princeton study as both figures illustrate what is needed to meet our basic needs in life. Similar studies have been conducted in other countries, finding similar results.

Cross-section studies conducted on money worship include those comparing lottery winners subjective happiness to those of accident victims or non-lottery winners finding that day-to-day happiness of lottery winners was the same with the main difference being what they perceived their future happiness would be, scoring it higher than the control groups. Furthermore, "every representative national survey ever done" has found a positive relationship between happiness and income, this research provides empirical data that at set points in time, money can provide short-term happiness. Research has also been conducted on how age can affect our happiness from money, revealing that younger adults are more influenced by money than older participants. When socio-demographic explanatory variables were included in the study of income and happiness, the only group that still had a positive relationship were young adults. This is supportive of the idea that younger adults are more Susceptible to money worship and that happiness from money is temporary, as the inclusion of socio-demographic explanatory variables made the relationship between happiness and money insignificant for middle-aged and old adults.

Whilst these different studies reveal that money doesn't bring, constant, long-term happiness, only short-term, the Skandia International Wealth Sentiment Monitor alongside other studies, did reveal that as many as 80% of people world-wide still hold the view that money will bring them happiness (the range between individual countries is 68% in Germany to 93% in Brazil). This ongoing belief that it brings happiness can result in money worship being described as a behavioral addiction, a persons need to make money can affect their day-to-day life due to their growing focus on making more and more money. It can become a mood-altering experience and lead to emotional disruptions, sharing similarities with substance addictions. Their behavior becomes influenced and guided by their desire to make money due to the false belief that it will bring them happiness.

Money worship can also be seen in several different religions. For instance, Prosperity Theology is a group in Christianity who worships money, viewing it to be a gift from God. In this belief group, they believe that "the poor are poor because of a lack of faith", they view wealth as a sign of following the bible and what God wants them to be. Stephen Hunt explained this as "health and wealth" being the 'automatic divine right of all Bible-believing Christians'. This belief presents much like money worship in science, as believers constantly desire more money, believing it to be a gift from God and that it would bring them happiness. Moreover, the Goddess Lakshmi is worshipped every Friday and on certain festivals in Hinduism, she is believed to be responsible for wealth and good fortune. Some believers keep silver coins with her image in their homes believing it will bring them wealth. Other religions also have gods which represent money, such as Plutus, Oshun, and Mercury, amongst countless others. Money worship is a prominent theme across a variety of religions.

References 

Personal finance
Types of mental disorders